Soan or Soans may refer to:

Soan (singer), French singer, winner of Nouvelle Star
Soan River, a river in Punjab, Pakistan
Soan Sakaser Valley, a valley in northern Punjab, Pakistan
Soan industry, a crude pebble industry of the Paleolithic.

Given name / family name
Ash Soan, a British drummer

See also
Soane (disambiguation)